Highway is the fourth studio album by the Canadian country music group The Wilkinsons. It was released on March 29, 2005.

Track listing
 "Little Girl" (Rob Crosby, Amanda Wilkinson, Steve Wilkinson) - 4:08
 "Melancholy Wine" (Charlie Craig, A. Wilkinson, S. Wilkinson) - 3:58
 "Leaving Song" (Crosby, Ray Stephenson, S. Wilkinson) - 3:43
 "Inside the Lines" (Brad Crisler, A. Wilkinson, S. Wilkinson) - 3:05
 "L.A." (Michael Dulaney, Natalie Hemby) - 3:19
 "One Blue Day" (Crosby, S. Wilkinson) - 4:08
 "No One's Gonna" (Craig, S. Wilkinson) - 3:25
 "Human" (Bruce Gatch, A. Wilkinson, Tyler Wilkinson) - 2:47
 "Highway" (Crosby, Stephenson, S. Wilkinson) - 4:07
 "Not Today" (Gary Burr, S. Wilkinson) - 4:12
 "Occasionally Crazy" (Crosby, A. Wilkinson, S. Wilkinson) - 3:07
 "You Want Me" (Tony Haselden) - 3:27
 "Williamstown" (John Scott Sherrill, S. Wilkinson) - 3:45
 "Grains of Sand" (Craig, Crosby, S. Wilkinson) - 3:38

Personnel

The Wilkinsons
 Amanda Wilkinson – vocals
 Steve Wilkinson – harmonica, vocals
 Tyler Wilkinson – vocals

Additional Musicians
 Joe Chemay – bass guitar
 Dan Dugmore – dobro, lap steel guitar, pedal steel guitar
 Shannon Forrest – drums, percussion
 Jerry Kimbrough – acoustic guitar
 Mike Rojas – keyboards
 Joe Spivey – fiddle
 John Willis – banjo, acoustic guitar, electric guitar, mandolin, sitar

The Wilkinsons albums
2005 albums
Open Road Recordings albums